Bruce Weir Ritchie (born February 1965) is a British property developer and residential landlord, and the owner of the Residential Land Group.

Early life
Bruce Weir Ritchie was born in February 1965. He was educated at Dulwich College where he was a contemporary of Nigel Farage. He is the son of professor H. David Ritchie, a leading surgeon in the 1980s at the Royal London Hospital and Dean of the Medical College, and his wife Jennifer Prentice, a State School teacher. His older brothers are a Queen's Counsel and a scientist.

Ritchie was brought up in Dulwich, South London.

Career
Ritchie left school after A levels and joined Harrods as a management trainee. He bought his first properties whilst still working for Harrod's.

In 1991, Ritchie founded Residential Land Limited and is its CEO. The company grew strongly in the 1990s and 2000s. Ritchie through his Residential Land Group of 163 companies owns around 1,200 privately rented properties in prime central London and Mayfair.

In the early 2000s Ritchie had a business partnership with the chef Marco Pierre White and his business partner Jimmy LaHood in relation to some central London restaurants.

Residential Land is one of the largest residential property companies in London. In 2016, Ritchie sold a block of 58 flats at Garden House, 86–92 Kensington Gardens Square, London W2, which he bought for "a low price" in 2001.

In the same year, Residential Land was named Asset Manager of the Year at the RESI Awards 2016, organised by Property Week.

In May 2016, Ritchie was named Entrepreneur of the Year at the PROPS Awards, a UK property industry awards event.

In July 2017, Ritchie was ranked 28th in Property Week’s annual Power 100 list, having been described as a ‘consummate dealmaker’.

Controversy
Ritchie was one of the co-chairmen of the Presidents Club charitable trust, which disbanded in 2018 after reports of sexual harassment and assault at its charity dinner.

In January 2018, as a result of the media attention that the presidents Club received, the Canadian investment group, Ivanhoé Cambridge, and a major financial backer of Ritchie, announced that it would make no further investments with his company, Residential Land.

Politics
Ritchie has been a staunch supporter of the Conservative Party throughout his adult life. In 2013, he and his wife Shadi donated £111,600 to the Conservative Party. As of 2018, the two had given the Conservative Party more than £750,000 personally and through their wholly owned company, Residential Land.

Personal life
Bruce Ritchie is married to Shadi and has two teenage children.

Ritchie alongside his wife Shadi are Event Chairs for the Elton John AIDS Foundation. Bruce was part of the committee that helped launch the first-ever Midsummer Party in July 2019, which raised $6m.

References

Living people
1965 births
People educated at Dulwich College
Conservative Party (UK) donors
British landlords